George Washington Jackson (born September 19, 1924) is an American former politician who was a Republican member of the Pennsylvania House of Representatives.
  He was born in Philadelphia.

References

1924 births
Living people
Republican Party members of the Pennsylvania House of Representatives
Politicians from Philadelphia